Rasbosoma is a genus of cyprinid fish found in the Mekong Basin of Southeast Asia (Cambodia, Laos, and Thailand). The genus contains only one species, the dwarf scissortail rasbora or Rasbosoma spilocerca. They are small fish with maximum size  SL.

References 

Fish of Thailand
Rasboras
Leuciscinae
Monotypic fish genera
Fish of the Mekong Basin
Fish of Cambodia
Fish of Laos
Fish described in 1987
Taxobox binomials not recognized by IUCN